Suncheon Hyocheon High School is a private high school located in Daeryong-dong, Suncheon-si, Jeollanam-do, Republic of Korea.

Notable alumni
Kim Kyung-Ho: Korean rock singer known for his efforts in bringing rock music to South Korea

See also
Education in South Korea

External links 
School website 
Hyocheon Alumni Associations 

High schools in South Korea
Schools in South Jeolla Province
Suncheon
Educational institutions established in 1984
Private schools in South Korea
1984 establishments in South Korea